Scottish musician and vocalist Isobel Campbell has released four solo studio albums, seven singles, a studio album in collaboration with Bill Wells and three with Mark Lanegan as well as several cameos on other artists' records. Isobel Campbell debuted in 1996 as cellist and sometime vocalist of indie pop band Belle & Sebastian. Despite limited commercial success, Belle & Sebastian have been hailed as the greatest Scottish band ever.

Campbell released two records under the pseudonym of The Gentle Waves whilst still a member of Belle & Sebastian, which she left in the midst of the band's 2002 North American tour. In 2003 she released Amorino, her first album under her own name, which received mixed reviews from critics. 2006 saw the release of Ballad of the Broken Seas, a critically acclaimed collaboration with Mark Lanegan which was later nominated for the Mercury Music Prize. This was followed by a solo album, Milkwhite Sheets, which spawned the single "O Love Is Teasin'". Campbell reunited with Lanegan to record Sunday at Devil Dirt, which was released on May 13, 2008.

Studio albums 

I Released under the pseudonym of The Gentle Waves.

Singles

Notes
 A ^ Appeared in the UK Singles Chart at number 116.
 B ^ Appeared in the UK Singles Chart at number 199.

Music videos

Collaborations

With Bill Wells

With Mark Lanegan

Other appearances

References
General

 [ "Isobel Campbell > Discography"]. Allmusic. Retrieved 22 July 2008.

Specific

External links 
 Isobel Campbell at MySpace
 [ Isobel Campbell] at Allmusic
 Isobel Campbell at Discogs

Discographies of British artists
Pop music discographies